Erek L. Barron (born 1974) is an American attorney and politician serving as the United States Attorney for the District of Maryland since 2021. He is a former member of the Maryland House of Delegates from the 24th district.

Early life and education
Barron was born in Washington, D.C., and attended the Episcopal High School in Alexandria, Virginia. In 1996, he graduated from the University of Maryland, College Park with a Bachelor of Arts degree in English. Three years later, he earned a Juris Doctor from the George Washington University Law School and was admitted to the Maryland Bar the same year. He later earned a Master of Laws, with a focus on International Law and National Security Law, from Georgetown University Law Center.

Career 
Barron has worked for the Maryland law firm of Whiteford, Taylor & Preston and is a member of the American Bar Association. Barron is a former prosecutor and has worked as an assistant state's attorney for Prince George's County and Baltimore City (2001–2006), a trial attorney in United States Department of Justice (2006–2007), and counsel and policy advisor to the United States Senate Committee on the Judiciary and Senator Joe Biden (2007–2009).

Maryland legislature
Barron first won election to the Maryland House of Delegates in 2014. He was sworn into office on January 14, 2015. In 2015, he and three other male legislators joined the Women's Legislators of Maryland Caucus, becoming the first men to join a women's caucus in the United States.

In 2019, Speaker of the Maryland House of Delegates Adrienne A. Jones appointed Barron to chair the Joint Committee on Fair Practices.

Committee assignments
 Co-Chair, Joint Committee on Fair Practices and State Personnel Oversight, 2019–2021
 Member, Health and Government Operations Committee, 2015–2021 (health facilities & occupations subcommittee, 2015–2016; government operations & long-term care subcommittee, 2015–2017; estates & trusts subcommittee, 2016–2017; government operations & estates & trusts subcommittee, 2017–2019; public health & minority health disparities subcommittee, 2017–2021; government operations & health facilities subcommittee, 2020–2021)
 Member, Legislative Policy Committee, 2020–2021

U.S. attorney for Maryland 

On July 26, 2021, Barron was nominated to be the United States attorney for the District of Maryland. On September 23, 2021, his nomination was reported out of committee by voice vote. On September 30, 2021, his nomination was confirmed in the United States Senate by voice vote. On October 7, 2021, he was sworn into office by Chief Judge James K. Bredar. He is Maryland's first black U.S. attorney.

On August 24, 2022, Barron announced a $3.5 million plan for addressing violent crime in Baltimore, which included new hires for the office's violent and organized crime section and pursuing repeat violent offenders "for any and all wrongdoing that meets our priorities, especially fraud."

Political positions

Criminal justice
During the 2016 legislative session, Barron pushed for the Justice Reinvestment Act to include a repeal of mandatory minimum sentencing laws. In March, the House Judiciary Committee voted 17-3 to adopt the "Barron-Wilson amendment" repealing mandatory minimums for nonviolent drug offenders while increasing penalties for leaders of gangs and organized crime. He also introduced legislation to prohibit public and private colleges and universities from including questions about criminal history on their applications.

In August 2016, Barron and four other state legislators sent a joint letter to Attorney General Brian Frosh to review the constitutionality of setting bail without considering whether a defendant could afford to pay under the 14th Amendment. The Attorney General's office responded to the letter in October by issuing an opinion stating that such a system was a possible violation of due process. In November, the Standing Committee on Rules of Practice and Procedure of the Maryland Court of Appeals voted 18-5 to recommend a policy change to prohibit Maryland judges from setting bail that is too high for defendants to pay unless the defendant is considered a flight risk or a danger to society. In February 2017, the Court of Appeals voted unanimously to adopt the rule change. During the 2017 legislative session, Barron sought to enshrine the court rule change into law.

During the 2019 legislative session, Barron introduced legislation to ease the process for prosecutors looking to overturn convictions deemed to be tainted or unjust. The bill passed and became law. He also introduced a bill to require county jails to provide addiction screening, counseling, and treatment with the use of methadone, Suboxone, and Vivitrol. The bill passed and was signed into law by Governor Larry Hogan on May 13, 2019.

During the 2020 legislative session, Barron introduced legislation to ease restrictions on when prosecutors could use hearsay evidence in cases of witness intimidation, and another bill to designate witness intimidation a crime of violence.

National politics
In April 2019, Barron and state Senator James Rosapepe launched "Biden for Maryland", becoming the first two Maryland lawmakers to endorse his bid for president.

Transportation
In May 2016, Barron and Marc Korman released a list of Metro reform proposals, including ideas involving dedicated funding, the make-up of the Washington Metropolitan Area Transit Authority board, and vendors in stations to boost revenue. During the 2018 legislative sesssion, he introduced legislation to raise the state's annual contribution to Metro by $125 million a year if Virginia and the Washington, D.C. agreed to do the same.

Electoral history

References

External links
 Biography at U.S. Department of Justice

1974 births
Living people
21st-century American lawyers
21st-century American politicians
African-American lawyers
African-American politicians
African-American state legislators in Maryland
Episcopal High School (Alexandria, Virginia) alumni
George Washington University Law School alumni
Georgetown University Law Center alumni
Democratic Party members of the Maryland House of Delegates
United States Attorneys for the District of Maryland
University of Maryland, College Park alumni